Arothron leopardus, known as the banded leopardblowfish, is a species of pufferfish in the family Tetraodontidae. It is a tropical marine species native to the Indian Ocean, where it is known from India, although its status as a species is uncertain and FishBase has stated that more references are needed to confirm its classification.

References 

leopardus
Fish described in 1878